Lusigliè is a comune (municipality) in the Metropolitan City of Turin in the Italian region Piedmont, located about  north of Turin.

Lusigliè borders the following municipalities: San Giorgio Canavese, Rivarolo Canavese, Ciconio, and Feletto.

References

Cities and towns in Piedmont
Canavese